Manuel García González (born 15 May 1935) is a Spanish boxer. He competed in the men's heavyweight event at the 1960 Summer Olympics. At the 1960 Summer Olympics in Rome, he lost to Andrey Abramov of the Soviet Union in the Round of 16 after receiving a bye in the Round of 32.

References

External links
 

1935 births
Living people
Spanish male boxers
Olympic boxers of Spain
Boxers at the 1960 Summer Olympics
Boxers from Barcelona
Heavyweight boxers
20th-century Spanish people
21st-century Spanish people